Samuel Kurtz (usually known as Sam Kurtz) is a Welsh Conservative politician who has been Member of the Senedd (MS) for Carmarthen West and South Pembrokeshire since the 2021 Senedd election. Kurtz was elected to Pembrokeshire County Council in 2017 to represent the Scleddau ward, defeating the sitting Independent member.

In May 2021, he succeeded Angela Burns, who stood down.

References

Year of birth missing (living people)
Living people
Conservative Party members of the Senedd
Wales MSs 2021–2026
Welsh Conservative councillors
People from Pembrokeshire
Welsh-speaking politicians